The instantaneous Earth–Moon distance, or distance to the Moon, is the distance from the center of Earth to the center of the Moon. Lunar distance (LD or ), or Earth–Moon characteristic distance, is a unit of measure in astronomy. More technically, it is the semi-major axis of the geocentric lunar orbit. A little less than 400 lunar distances make up an astronomical unit.

Lunar distance is commonly used to express the distance to near-Earth object encounters. Lunar semi-major axis is an important astronomical datum; the few millimeter precision of the range measurements determines semi-major axis to a few decimeters; it has implications for testing gravitational theories such as general relativity, and for refining other astronomical values, such as the mass, radius, and rotation of Earth. The measurement is also useful in characterizing the lunar radius, as well as the mass of and distance to the Sun.

Millimeter-precision measurements of the lunar distance are made by measuring the time taken for laser beam light to travel between stations on Earth and retroreflectors placed on the Moon.

Value

An AU is  Lunar distances.
A lightyear is 24,611,700 Lunar distances.

Variation 
The instantaneous lunar distance is constantly changing. There are other effects that also influence the lunar distance. Some factors are described in this section.

Perturbations and eccentricity 
However, due to its elliptical orbit with varying eccentricity, the instantaneous distance varies with monthly periodicity. Furthermore, the distance is perturbed by the gravitational effects of various astronomical bodies – most significantly the Sun and less so Venus and Jupiter. Other forces responsible for minute perturbations are: gravitational attraction to other planets in the Solar System and to asteroids; tidal forces; and relativistic effects. The effect of radiation pressure from the Sun contributes an amount of ± to the lunar distance.

These perturbations are well understood and the lunar distance can be accurately modeled over thousands of years.

Tidal dissipation 
Through the action of tidal forces, the angular momentum of Earth's rotation is slowly being transferred to the Moon's orbit. The result is that Earth's rate of spin is gradually decreasing (at a rate of ), and the lunar orbit is gradually expanding. However, it is believed that this rate has recently increased, as a rate of  would imply that the Moon is only 1.5 billion years old, whereas scientific consensus supports an age of about 4 billion years. It is also believed that this anomalously high rate of recession may continue to accelerate.

It is predicted that the lunar distance will continue to increase until (in theory) the Earth and Moon become tidally locked, as are Pluto and Charon. This would occur when the duration of the lunar orbital period equals the rotational period of Earth, which is estimated to be 47 of our current days. The two bodies would then be at equilibrium, and no further rotational energy would be exchanged. However, models predict that 50 billion years would be required to achieve this configuration, which is significantly longer than the expected lifetime of the Solar System.

Orbital history 
Laser measurements show that the average lunar distance is increasing, which implies that the Moon was closer in the past, and that Earth's days were shorter.

In this theory, the initial impact is assumed to have occurred 4.5 billion years ago.

History of measurement 
Until the late 1950s all measurements of lunar distance were based on optical angular measurements: the earliest accurate measurement was by Hipparchus in the 2nd century BC. The space age marked a turning point when the precision of this value was much improved. During the 1950s and 1960s, there were experiments using radar, lasers, and spacecraft, conducted with the benefit of computer processing and modeling.

This section is intended to illustrate some of the historically significant or otherwise interesting methods of determining the lunar distance, and is not intended to be an exhaustive or all-encompassing list.

Parallax 
The oldest method of determining the lunar distance involved measuring the angle between the Moon and a chosen reference point from multiple locations, simultaneously. The synchronization can be coordinated by making measurements at a pre-determined time, or during an event which is observable to all parties. Before accurate mechanical chronometers, the synchronization event was typically a lunar eclipse, or the moment when the Moon crossed the meridian (if the observers shared the same longitude). This measurement technique is known as lunar parallax.

For increased accuracy, certain adjustments must be made, such as adjusting the measured angle to account for refraction and distortion of light passing through the atmosphere.

Lunar eclipse 
Early attempts to measure the distance to the Moon exploited observations of a lunar eclipse combined with knowledge of Earth's radius and an understanding that the Sun is much further than the Moon. By observing the geometry of a lunar eclipse, the lunar distance can be calculated using trigonometry.

Meridian crossing 
An expedition by French astronomer A.C.D. Crommelin observed lunar meridian transits on the same night from two different locations. Careful measurements from 1905 to 1910 measured the angle of elevation at the moment when a specific lunar crater (Mösting A) crossed the local meridian, from stations at Greenwich and at Cape of Good Hope.

Occultations 
By recording the instant when the Moon occults a background star, (or similarly, measuring the angle between the Moon and a background star at a predetermined moment) the lunar distance can be determined, as long as the measurements are taken from multiple locations of known separation.

Astronomers O'Keefe and Anderson calculated the lunar distance by observing four occultations from nine locations in 1952.

Radar 

The distance to the moon was measured by means of radar first in 1946 as part of Project Diana.

Later, an experiment was conducted in 1957 at the U.S. Naval Research Laboratory that used the echo from radar signals to determine the Earth-Moon distance. Radar pulses lasting  were broadcast from a  diameter radio dish. After the radio waves echoed off the surface of the Moon, the return signal was detected and the delay time measured. From that measurement, the distance could be calculated. In practice, however, the signal-to-noise ratio was so low that an accurate measurement could not be reliably produced.

The experiment was repeated in 1958 at the Royal Radar Establishment, in England. Radar pulses lasting  were transmitted with a peak power of 2 megawatts, at a repetition rate of 260 pulses per second. After the radio waves echoed off the surface of the Moon, the return signal was detected and the delay time measured. Multiple signals were added together to obtain a reliable signal by superimposing oscilloscope traces onto photographic film.

These initial experiments were intended to be proof-of-concept experiments and only lasted one day.

Laser ranging 

An experiment which measured the round-trip time of flight of laser pulses reflected directly off the surface of the Moon was performed in 1962, by a team from Massachusetts Institute of Technology, and a Soviet team at the Crimean Astrophysical Observatory.

During the Apollo missions in 1969, astronauts placed retroreflectors on the surface of the Moon for the purpose of refining the accuracy and precision of this technique. The measurements are ongoing and involve multiple laser facilities. The instantaneous precision of the Lunar Laser Ranging experiments can achieve few millimeter resolution, and is the most reliable method of determining the lunar distance to date. The semi-major axis is determined to be 384,399.0 km.

Amateur astronomers and citizen scientists 

Due to the modern accessibility of accurate timing devices, high resolution digital cameras, GPS receivers, powerful computers and near-instantaneous communication, it has become possible for amateur astronomers to make high accuracy measurements of the lunar distance.

On May 23, 2007, digital photographs of the Moon during a near-occultation of Regulus were taken from two locations, in Greece and England. By measuring the parallax between the Moon and the chosen background star, the lunar distance was calculated.

A more ambitious project called the "Aristarchus Campaign" was conducted during the lunar eclipse of 15 April 2014. During this event, participants were invited to record a series of five digital photographs from moonrise until culmination (the point of greatest altitude).

The method took advantage of the fact that the Moon is actually closest to an observer when it is at its highest point in the sky, compared to when it is on the horizon. Although it appears that the Moon is biggest when it is near the horizon, the opposite is true. This phenomenon is known as the Moon illusion. The reason for the difference in distance is that the distance from the center of the Moon to the center of the Earth is nearly constant throughout the night, but an observer on the surface of Earth is actually 1 Earth radius from the center of Earth. This offset brings them closest to the Moon when it is overhead.

Modern cameras have now reached a resolution level capable of capturing the Moon with enough precision to perceive and more importantly to measure this tiny variation in apparent size. The results of this experiment were calculated as LD = . The benefit of this method is that the only measuring equipment needed is a modern digital camera (equipped with an accurate clock, and a GPS receiver).

Other experimental methods of measuring the lunar distance that can be performed by amateur astronomers involve:
 Taking pictures of the Moon before it enters the penumbra and after it is completely eclipsed.
 Measuring, as precisely as possible, the time of the eclipse contacts. 
 Taking good pictures of the partial eclipse when the shape and size of the Earth shadow are clearly visible. 
 Taking a picture of the Moon including, in the same field of view, Spica and Mars – from various locations.

See also
Astronomical unit
Ephemeris
Jet Propulsion Laboratory Development Ephemeris
Lunar Laser Ranging Experiment
Lunar theory
On the Sizes and Distances (Aristarchus)
Orbit of the Moon
Prutenic Tables of Erasmus Reinhold
Supermoon

References

External links 
 Wolfram Alpha widget – Current Moon Earth distance

Orbit of the Moon
Units of measurement in astronomy
Units of length